Great Asby is a village in Cumbria, England.

In present times the village is used mainly by the farming community.

The village's church is St Peter's Church, which was built between 1863 and 1866.

Geography
Asby Gill runs through the middle of Great Asby although this gill tends more commonly to be dry except after heavy rain.

See also

Listed buildings in Asby, Eden
Asby, Eden (civil parish)
Little Asby
Pate Hole

Yorkshire Dales National Park Great Asby included August 2016

Westmorland Way Great Asby is on the Appleby to Arnside walking route

Westmorland Dales Great Asby is in the Westmorland Dales

References

External links

 Great Asby Village website

Villages in Cumbria
Eden District

Yorkshire Dales National Park Great Asby included August 2016

Westmorland Way Appleby to Arnside walking route

Westmorland Dales